Norhan Bayomi is an Egyptian environmental scientist, architect, inventor, electronic music producer and a Trance DJ with the name "Nourey". Bayomi was born in Egypt and currently lives in Boston, Massachusetts.

Bayomi attained a bachelor’s degree in Architecture in 2008 and went on to attain a Master’s degree in 2009 in Environmental design at Cairo University. Later, she went to MIT to pursue another Master’s degree in Architectural and Building Sciences/Technology. Norhan is currently a PhD student at MIT. Norhan is, also, the co-founder of an architectural firm, with branches in Cairo and Riyadh, and the co-founder of two start-ups: Lamarr.AI and Urban Data Analytics.

Norhan's research is focused on environment and climate change with a focus on the impacts in developing regions, and what role the built environment can play in addressing this. Norhan explores the utilization of technology and AI to help build a better understanding regarding building and urban design, and defining suitable adaptation strategies.

Anjunabeats, the London record label owned by Above & Beyond signed with Norhan, under the artist name “Nourey”. From her dorm room, Norhan's first livestream act took place on the 15th of July 2020.

References 

Living people
Year of birth missing (living people)
Cairo University alumni
Massachusetts Institute of Technology alumni
Place of birth missing (living people)
Egyptian electronic musicians